Maxime Chanot (born 21 November 1989) is a professional footballer who plays as a central defender for New York City FC in Major League Soccer. Born in France, he represents Luxembourg at international level.

Club career
Having joined Sheffield United in 2006 from Stade de Reims Chanot became a regular in the academy and reserves sides. The aggressive, athletic central defender joined Mansfield Town on loan on 4 October 2008, and made his debut for Mansfield in the 0–1 defeat against Woking despite picking up man of the match award. He returned to Bramall Lane having played five games for The Stags. As the Blades looked to cut costs, having failed to gain promotion, Chanot was released at the end of the 2008–09 season.

In November 2009 he signed a two-year contract with French Ligue 1 side Le Mans FC. He then moved on a season-long loan to FC Gueugnon in 2010.

In September 2011, Chanot signed a one-year deal for Belgium team White Star Woluwe FC, which was successively extended for one more season. Sport/Foot Magazine named him among the twenty best second division football players of the league. His great performances drew the attention of a Division 1 Belgium team, Beerschot AC which signed him in 2013.

KV Kortrijk
Chanot continued to impress and was offered a contract by another Division 1 Belgium team, KV Kortrijk. Chanot was named several times best defender of the Belgium championship. Despite being chased by many clubs, especially Queen Park Rangers and Chievo Verona, he decided to join New York City FC coached by Patrick Vieira.

In December 2019, Chanot was named to the KV Kortrijk team of the decade.

New York City
On 16 July 2016, it was announced that Chanot had signed with Major League Soccer club New York City FC. Chanot made his NYCFC debut as a halftime substitute for Jefferson Mena during a 5–1 victory against the Colorado Rapids on 30 July 2016. Chanot was given Team of the Week honors by MLS the following week for his performance during his first start for New York City against the San Jose Earthquakes. He finished the season having made 8 league appearances as well as starting both of NYCFC's playoff games.

On 3 June 2017, Chanot scored his first MLS goal in a 2–1 win over Philadelphia Union. A few weeks later, Chanot scored his second goal of the season against Whitecaps Vancouver after an assist from Andrea Pirlo. Chanot made 19 appearances in the 2017 MLS season before being sidelined on 20 July with a herniated disk in his back. Initial reports thought the injury would only keep him out 2–4 weeks but after further evaluation Chanot had to undergo surgery and he missed the rest of the season, including both of NYCFC's playoff matches.

Over the next two seasons, Chanot's defensive partnership with Alexander Callens was recognized as one of the best in MLS.
At the end of the 2019 season, Chanot was named NYCFC best defender of the year. NYCFC also rewarded Chanot with the Most Minutes Played award.
Chanot's performance did not go unnoticed and the Major League Soccer named him fourth best defender of the 2019 season.

International career 
A Luxembourg international, Chanot scored his first goal for his national team on 4 June 2014, netting an equaliser in a friendly game against four-time FIFA World Cup winners Italy played at Stadio Renato Curi, Perugia. The game ended in a 1–1 draw.

On 13 November 2016, he converted a penalty in a World Cup qualifier against the Netherlands, which ended up being a 3–1 loss for Luxembourg.

Personal life
In March 2018, Chanot earned a U.S. green card which qualifies him as a domestic player for MLS roster purposes.

Career statistics

Club

International

International goals
Scores and results list Luxembourg's goal tally first, score column indicates score after each Chanot goal.

Honours
New York City FC
MLS Cup: 2021
MLS Eastern Conference Championship: 2021
Campeones Cup: 2022

References

External links
 Mansfield Town Profile

FIFA bio

1989 births
Living people
AS Nancy Lorraine players
Association football defenders
Beerschot A.C. players
Belgian Pro League players
Challenger Pro League players
FC Gueugnon players
French footballers
French people of Luxembourgian descent
K.V. Kortrijk players
Le Mans FC players
Luxembourg international footballers
Luxembourgian footballers
Major League Soccer players
Mansfield Town F.C. players
New York City FC players
Sportspeople from Nancy, France
RWS Bruxelles players
Sheffield United F.C. players
Stade de Reims players
Luxembourgian expatriate sportspeople in the United States
Footballers from Grand Est
French expatriate sportspeople in the United States
Luxembourgian expatriate sportspeople in Belgium
Luxembourgian expatriate sportspeople in England
French expatriate sportspeople in Belgium
French expatriate sportspeople in England